Scott Myers-Lipton (born September 15, 1959) is a former professional tennis player from the United States. Currently, he is a professor at San Jose State University, where he focuses on teaching students about power and democracy by launching and working on campaigns in order to change a policy.

Biography

Tennis career
A left-handed player from San Jose, California, Lipton won the Central Coast Section (CCS) in high school and the Sectionals for Northern California in the Boys 18s in 1977, and then went on to be a three-time All-American college tennis player at the University of San Diego, before competing on the professional tour in the early 1980s.

Lipton twice featured in the main draw of the US Open. In 1982 he lost a fifth set tiebreak to Vincent Van Patten to exit in the opening round. Returning in 1983 he played another five set match to start the tournament, but won on this occasion, over Jim Gurfein. He was beaten in the second round by 16 year old Aaron Krickstein.

On the professional tour he reached his best ranking of 105 in 1983. His best performance on the Grand Prix circuit was a semi-final appearance at the 1983 Swedish Open, where he had a win in the quarter-finals against world number 7 Henrik Sundström.

Academia

Scott Myers-Lipton is a Professor of Sociology at San Jose State University and is the author of numerous books, including: CHANGE! A Guide to Teaching Social Action (Routledge, 2022), CHANGE! A Student Guide to Social Action (Routledge 2018), Ending Extreme Inequality: An Economic Bill of Rights Approach to Eliminate Poverty (Paradigm 2015), Rebuild America: Solving the Economic Crisis through Civic Works (Paradigm 2009) and Social Solutions to Poverty: America's Struggle to Build a Just Society (Paradigm 2006), as well as numerous scholarly articles on racism, education, and civic engagement.

Myers-Lipton is a public intellectual. He co-founded with his students the successful effort to raise the minimum wage in San José from $8 to $10, and the Gulf Coast Civic Works Campaign, an initiative to develop 100,000 prevailing wage jobs for local and displaced workers after Hurricane Katrina. In the 1990 and 2000s, he helped students develop solutions to poverty by taking them to live at homeless shelters, the Navajo and Lakota nations, the Gulf Coast, and Kingston, Jamaica. For the past 14 years, he has taught a social action course at SJSU in the fall and spring semesters. Social action is unique in that it is designed to do democracy; instead of just reading about social change, students learn about power and democracy by launching and working on campaigns to change a policy. Myers-Lipton is working with Bobby Hackett at the Bonner Foundation to mainstream teaching social action across the country on college campuses (https://www.bonner.org/social-action-course-initiative-launched). Below is a list of some of the victories that social action students have had at San Jose State:

 in 2020, got the SJSU President to agree to develop a 12-emergency bed program and $2 million rental assistance program for houseless students; https://sanfrancisco.cbslocal.com/video/4422900-officials-unveil-plan-for-affordable-housing-for-san-jose-state-students/in
 in 2019, got Santa Clara County to clear and expunge 13,000 cannabis convictions: https://sanjosespotlight.com/student-activists-celebrate-countys-cannabis-conviction-clearance/
 in 2017, convinced the SJSU President to agree to rejoin the Workers Rights Consortium, ensuring SJSU apparel is not made in sweatshops; https://www.youtube.com/watch?v=JehGpi88oYAin
 in 2015, got the SJSU President to agree to install air conditioning in a 70 year-old building where several students had fainted due to heat exhaustion; https://www.facebook.com/StudentsforDMH/in 
 in 2014, convinced the SJSU President to remove a Tower Foundation board member, after she made a racist comment about Latinas; www.nbcbayarea.com/news/local/san-jose-state-university-students-protest-board-members-alleged-racist-statement/78156
 in 2012, developed and led the Measure D campaign in the 2012 election, raising San Jose’s minimum wage from $8 to $10 an hour, and then pushing it to $15; https://news.yahoo.com/student-class-project-leads-minimum-163959852.html 

At San Jose State, Myers-Lipton was a member of  “Commemorating A Legacy Project Committee” at San Jose State to develop the Tommie Smith and John Carlos statues. After the statues were erected, Myers-Lipton created the “Ad Hoc Tommie Smith and John Carlos Committee” since the University was not planning to commemorate October 16th, the day they raised their fists in Mexico City. For the past 15 years, Myers-Lipton has ensured there was a campus event to commemorate this day (https://blogs.sjsu.edu/coss/2018/10/01/tommie-smith-and-john-carlos/comment-page-1). In addition, he suggested the idea to give honorary doctorates to Tommie and John, and wrote part of the language to the CSU Chancellor’s Office in this successful effort.

As a public intellectual, Myers-Lipton felt compelled to respond to the murder of George Floyd and Ahmaud Arbery, and the shooting of Breonna Taylor, and the global uprising that took place in response. Myers-Lipton created the Silicon Valley Pain Index (see @SVpainindex), which was published by the SJSU Human Rights Institute. This report, which will be released annually, examines recent studies, and explores institutionalized racism in Silicon Valley. He is also administrator of Protect Our Community on Facebook, a super-coalition of Silicon Valley non-profits.

Myers-Lipton is the recipient of the NAACP Social Justice Award in San Jose/Silicon Valley, the Elbert Reed Award from the Dr. Martin Luther King Jr. Association of Santa Clara County, and the Manuel Vega Latino Empowerment Award.  He lives with his wife and two children, Gabriela and Josiah, in the Bay Area.

References

External links
 
 

1959 births
Living people
American male tennis players
American sociologists
San Diego Toreros men's tennis players
Tennis people from California
Academics from California
San Jose State University faculty